Henry Stock  (1824/5–1909) was a British architect. He served as the county surveyor for Essex for nearly 50 years, and as the surveyor and architect to the Worshipful Company of Haberdashers. The latter appointment led Stock to undertake a considerable number of educational commissions, but his primary field of activity was in the construction of manufacturing sites and warehouses in London.

Life and works
Henry Stock was born in 1824/5. He came from a family of builders and developers located in London's East End. Articled to George Allen, of Tooley Street, Southwark, in 1840, Stock took over the business on Allen's death in 1847, going into partnership with a surveyor, William Snooke, at Allen's old offices at 69, Tooley Street. 

Stock and Snooke's business was primarily industrial and commercial. Their buildings included a biscuit factory at Bermondsey for Peek Freans; the Anchor Brewery in Southwark for Barclay, Perkins & Co.; another brewery, the Ram Brewery at Wandsworth for Young & Co.; and the cotton warehouse on Tooley Street, which had earlier been designed by Snooke and was renamed The Counting House, following its rebuilding after destruction in the 1861 Tooley Street fire.

Stock and Snooke were appointed architects and surveyors to the Worshipful Company of Haberdashers in 1882, although both had undertaken work for the company prior to this date. Examples of their work in Wales include: the Design and Technology Centre (Stock alone), day houses and School House (the former by Snooke in 1877–1878 and the latter by Stock in 1895–1896), the Chapel and Library (1860–1865), and the central block (Stock alone 1895–1896), all at Monmouth School for Boys; Haberdashers' Monmouth School for Girls in the Jacobethan style he favoured for schools, and West Monmouth School. Snooke and Stock also undertook residential developments at New Cross and at Telegraph Hill in south London. The New Cross estate had been purchased in 1614 to provide a source of funding for the school established at Monmouth by William Jones. 

Stock held the post of County Surveyor for Essex from 1856 to 1900 and designed many public buildings and bridges in the county. In 1885 he was elected a Fellow of the Royal Institute of British Architects. He retired to Sandown on the Isle of Wight in 1904 and died there in 1909. His son, Henry William Stock, was also an architect and worked in his father's practice.

Works
 Monmouth School for Boys (1860–1890s) – work with Snooke and independently
 Tooley Street warehouses (1860) – by Snooke and Stock
 Buck's Row (Durward Street), Whitechapel (c.1861) – Manure works for George Torr, now the site of Swanlea School
 Church of St Mary, Stifford, Essex (1861–1863) – restoration
 School, Buck's Row, 6 Durward Street, Whitechapel (1862) – a ragged school sponsored by George Torr
 Braintree and Bocking Literary and Mechanics' Institution, Braintree, Essex (1863) – a gift to the town from George Courtauld
 St John the Baptist's Church, Finchingfield, Essex (1865–1866) – addition of a porch and restoration  
 Bridge, Battlesbridge, Essex (1872–1873) – built by William Webster to Stock's design after the earlier bridge, designed by Stock's predecessor as County Surveyor, Thomas Hopper, was destroyed by a steam traction engine.
 Peek Freans factory, Clement Road, Bermondsey (1880s) - part of a large manufacturing and packing plant with workers’ housing, shops, an independent fire brigade etc., which saw the area nicknamed Biscuit Town. As of 2020, being redeveloped as residential accommodation.  
 Ram Brewery (1882–1883) – rebuilding following a fire
 St Anne's Church, Kew (1884) – reconstruction of the southern end of the church
 Police station, Saffron Waldon, Essex (1884–1886) – undertaken in his role as County Surveyor
 The Counting House, Tooley Street, Southwark – rebuilding in 1887 following the 1861 Tooley Street fire
 Haberdashers' School for Girls (1890)
 Haberdashers' Monmouth School for Girls (1892–1896)
 Church of St Catherine, Pepys Road, New Cross (1893–1894) – much altered
 West Monmouth School (1897)

Gallery

Notes

References

Sources
 
 
 
 
 
 

1820s births
1909 deaths
19th-century English architects
Architects from London
Fellows of the Royal Institute of British Architects